Luca Ekler (born 28 October 1998) is a Hungarian Paralympic athlete who competes in the 100 metres, 200 metres and long jump events. She is a three-time European Champion and one-time World Champion. She is the sister of water polo players Bendegúz Ekler and Zsombor Ekler, who both play for the Hungarian national team and won a bronze medal at the 2018 Youth World Water Polo Championships.

Ekler had a brain haemorrhage aged ten and has paralysis on the left side of her body.

References

External links
 

1998 births
Living people
Sportspeople from Szombathely
Paralympic athletes of Hungary
Hungarian female long jumpers
Hungarian female sprinters
Medalists at the World Para Athletics Championships
Medalists at the World Para Athletics European Championships
Athletes (track and field) at the 2020 Summer Paralympics
20th-century Hungarian women
21st-century Hungarian women